San Xuan de Prendones is a parish (administrative division) in the municipality of El Franco, within the province and autonomous community of Asturias, in northern Spain. 

The population is 293 (INE 2007).

Villages
 Arbedeiras
 Boimouro
 Carbexe
 El Llouredal
 Nenín
 Prendonés
 A Rebollada
 Sueiro
 San Xuan
 Zarredo

References 

Parishes in El Franco